Patric Michael Cilliers (born 3 March 1987) is a rugby union player who won 6 caps for  in 2012. His position is prop.

Career

South Africa
Born  in Pietermaritzburg, South Africa and educated at Michaelhouse, Cilliers began his professional career with the Sharks, but his time with the team was limited by knee injuries. He transferred with fellow Shark Michael Rhodes to the Lions at the end of the 2010 Currie Cup Premier Division season. Cilliers was selected in the starting line-up for the 2011 Currie Cup final against the Sharks, and scored a try in the memorable 42-16 victory. He also played for the Lions in the Super Rugby. During his time in Johannesburg, he was also called up to the national team, making his debut on 18 August 2012 against Argentina.

Europe
He then joined South African coach Jake White at French Top 14 side , where he played from 2014 to 2016 before joining English Premiership side Leicester Tigers prior to the 2016–2017 season.  Cilliers made his Leicester debut on 4 November 2016 against Bath in an Anglo-Welsh Cup match.  After 26 appearances over two seasons Cilliers moved on to London Irish in the summer of 2018. He was released ahead of the 2020–21 season.

References

External links

Lions Profile
It's Rugby profile
London Irish Player Profile

1987 births
Living people
Afrikaner people
Expatriate rugby union players in England
Expatriate rugby union players in France
Golden Lions players
Leicester Tigers players
Lions (United Rugby Championship) players
London Irish players
Montpellier Hérault Rugby players
Rugby union players from Pietermaritzburg
Rugby union props
Sharks (Currie Cup) players
Sharks (rugby union) players
South Africa international rugby union players
South African rugby union players
Stormers players
Western Province (rugby union) players
Alumni of Michaelhouse